The Football Association Challenge Vase, usually referred to as the FA Vase, is an annual football competition for teams playing in Steps 5 and 6 of the English National League System (or equivalently, tier 9 or 10 of the overall English football league system). For the 2017–18 season 619 entrants were accepted, with two qualifying rounds preceding the seven proper rounds, semi-finals (played over two legs) and final to be played at Wembley Stadium.

The 2022 winners were Newport Pagnell Town, who beat Littlehampton Town 3–0 at Wembley Stadium.

History 

Until 1974, football players were either professionals or amateurs. Professionals were paid to play by their clubs, and the only cup competitions such clubs were allowed to enter were the FA Cup and, after 1969, for clubs outside the Football League, the FA Trophy. Amateurs, on the other hand, were not paid (at least not officially) by their clubs, and such clubs had their own cup competition, the FA Amateur Cup.

In 1974, with many of the top amateur players receiving payment for playing, the Football Association abolished the distinction, scrapped the Amateur Cup and introduced the FA Vase for the majority of clubs who had previously played in the competition. Well over 200 clubs entered in the first season, 1974–75, when Hoddesdon Town of the Spartan League beat Epsom & Ewell of the Surrey Senior League 2–1 in the final at Wembley Stadium before a crowd of 9,000.

In September 2021 Hinckley AFC set a new record score in the competition, beating St Martins 18-0.

Eligibility 

In recent years, entry to the FA Vase has been restricted to clubs in the ninth and lower tiers of the English football league system (those in the four levels above the ninth qualified for the FA Trophy). Reorganisation of the National League System for 2004 onwards moved the dividing line down to the new "Step 5" (ninth tier overall). Clubs from the Channel Islands (First Tower United, St. Martins and Vale Recreation) and the Isle of Man (Douglas HSOB) also entered the Vase in the past. Guernsey F.C., who were formed in 2011 and played in the "Step 5" Combined Counties League, gained entry for the 2012–13 season and reached the semi-finals.

Exemptions
Eligible teams who played in the FA Vase the previous season and finished in the top four of a Step 5 league are exempt from qualifying, and start play in the first round proper of the Vase, unless they were promoted to a Step 4 league. (If they were promoted, they would play for the FA Trophy instead.)
Eligible teams who played in the FA Trophy the previous season and were relegated from a Step 4 league are exempt from qualifying, and start play in the first round proper of the Vase as well.
Clubs that played in the 4th round or later of the previous season's FA Vase are exempt from qualifying and the first round, and start play in the second round proper.

Finals

Only five teams have won the FA Vase more than once. Whitley Bay are the only team to win the FA Vase three times in successive seasons, while Billericay Town, Tiverton Town and Halesowen Town have won back-to-back titles. As of 2017–18, at least one Northern League team has reached the final for 10 consecutive seasons, with teams from the league winning the title in all but two of those years. In 2017 Forest Green Rovers became the first FA Vase winners to go on to play in the English Football League, while one former Football League team (Glossop North End) have been beaten finalists.

Media coverage
BT Sport showed the 2016 FA Vase Final between Hereford and Morpeth Town live on 22 May as part of a double-header along with the 2016 FA Trophy Final. This has continued in more recent years.

References

External links

The FA Vase at the FA website

 
9
Recurring sporting events established in 1974
Amateur association football